The Diables Rouges de Briançon (: Briançon Red Devils) (Briançon Alpes Provence Hockey Club and before Hockey Club Briançon) is the ice hockey team of Briançon (Hautes-Alpes). Their home arena is the Patinoire René Froger.

Awards and trophies

Honours
Coupe Magnus: (1)
 Winner: 2014.
 Finalist: 1988, 2008, 2009.

Coupe de France: (2)
 Winner: 2010, 2013. Finalist: 2005, 2006.Coupe de la Ligue: (1) Winner: 2012.
 Finalist: 2008, 2009, 2011.Match des Champions: (1) Winner: 2013.
 Finalist: 2009, 2014.Coupe des As: (1) 
 Winner: 1992.
 Finalist: .Division 1:(1) 
 Winner: 1997.Division 2:(1) 
 Winner: 1994.Division 3:(1)''' 
 Winner: 1993.

They won the Marcel Claret Trophy in 1982-83, 1983–84, 2009-10 et 2010-11.

History
The club is founded in 1934. The team made its comeback in the Ligue Magnus since the 2002-2003 season.

Players

Current roster
As of November 11, 2022

|}

Coaches

Presidents 
List:
 Pierre Gravier (1935-?)
 Émile Roul
 Brochier
  (1941-?)
 Antoine Faure (1952-?)
  (1958–1970)
 Yvon Peythieu (1970–1984)
 Jean-Paul Garnero (1984–1985)
 Bernard Voiron (1985–1987)
 Philippe Pacull (1987–1988)
 Christian Séard (1988–1989)
 Philippe Pacull (1989–1990)
  (1990–1991)
 Philippe Pacull (1993–1998)
 Bernard Rouillard (1999)
 Jean-Pierre Bortino (1999–2001)
  (2001 – July 2009)
 Jean-Paul Garnero (July 2009 – Sep 2010)
 Sébastien Sode & Luc Rougny (Sep 2010 - Jan 2015)
 Guillaume Lebigot & Luc Rougny (Jan-Sep 2015)
 Guillaume Lebigot (since Sep 2015)

Players

Awards

Captains

NHL players

References

External links
Official site

Ice hockey teams in France
Sport in Hautes-Alpes
Ice hockey clubs established in 1934
1934 establishments in France